Rock Church is an evangelical megachurch located in San Diego, California, with five campuses located in Point Loma, San Marcos,  El Cajon, Chula Vista, and City Heights. Miles McPherson, a former NFL player, has served as senior pastor since he founded the church in 2000. With an average weekly attendance of more than 19,000 as of January 2016 at four weekly services at each campus, as well as live online streaming, the Rock is one of the largest churches in San Diego.

History
Rock Church held its first service at San Diego State University in 2000. Two years later, Rock Academy opened its doors to students. In 2005 the Rock began construction on their new building at Liberty Station and two years later, the new campus was open. In 2010 Rock Church North County opened, followed by the East County campus in 2013, San Ysidro campus in 2014, and City Heights in 2015. Rock Church also has a thrift store located in Point Loma).

Point Loma Campus

The Point Loma Campus is  building located in the historic Liberty Station. Because of the large size of the sanctuary, it is often used for high-profile funerals, such as those for police officers killed in the line of duty. The Point Loma campus also served as a shelter and resource center during the wildfires that spread across San Diego in 2007.

Adjacent to the church is the Rock Academy, a private Christian school serving preschool through 12th grade with more than 400 students. The building was originally constructed in 1969 as the Technical Training Center, Building 94, and was a 3-story reinforced concrete structure containing 170 classrooms, and a training galley on its first floor. During the renovations, the southern half of the structure was demolished to construct the worship center, with the rest of the structure receiving a new facade.

Community service

McPherson encourages churchgoers to demonstrate the love of God through service in their communities. McPherson, who has published several books, released Do Something: Make Your Life Count in 2009, which focuses on helping individuals do something in their communities.

The Rock offers more than 150 external ministries for members to serve in. These include ministries that work in prisons, homeless shelters, strip clubs, hospital oncology wings, with military families, and more. In 2015, the church donated more than 220,000 hours of service on projects for the City of San Diego as designated by Mayor Kevin Faulconer and other community leaders, at an estimated value of $4 million.

The church mobilizes volunteers throughout the year to tackle beautification projects chosen by community leaders. In March 2012 and September 2011, volunteers cleaned up the Jackie Robinson YMCA and the Barrio Logan neighborhood. The church also hosts large charity events such as the annual December Toys for Joy event, which gives toys, groceries, clothing, and personal services to families in need.

Conflicts
The church's current location in the middle of Point Loma has also led to conflicts with the neighborhood over traffic and parking issues, leading to numerous complaints and a multimillion-dollar class-action lawsuit against Liberty Station’s developer, Corky McMillin Companies. In May 2012 the San Diego County Grand Jury issued a report concluding that the church's location in an area designated for education use is inappropriate, and recommending that the city "Suspend the current Conditional Use Permit for the Rock Academy and Church pending a review for compliance and compatibility with the NTC Precise Plan and Local Coastal Program report (September 2001) and determine the church’s appropriateness for that area." However, in August the mayor said he would not suspend the church's permit, describing the proposed suspension as "unreasonable".

References

External links 
 
 
DO Something: Make Your Life Count
The Rock Academy - Official Website
Rock School of Ministry - Official Website

Evangelical churches in San Diego
Evangelical megachurches in the United States
Megachurches in California
Christian organizations established in 2000
Buildings and structures in San Diego
Churches in San Diego County, California